Frank Mottek is an American broadcast journalist known as “The Voice of Business News in Los Angeles” for his business reports on radio and television stations in Los Angeles, and hosting business news shows including "Mottek On Money." His broadcasts and podcasts have provided business, consumer and financial news to millions in the Greater Los Angeles area. Mottek also serves as moderator and master of ceremonies at business events and conferences. He is also known for his reporting and anchoring on TV stations KCAL-TV, KCBS-TV and KTLA in Los Angeles as well as the Nightly Business Report on PBS.

Early life and education 
Mottek received his Associate of Arts degree from Broward Community College in Fort Lauderdale, Florida and a Bachelor of Liberal Studies from Barry University in Miami.

Career

Radio and television 
 1978-80 - Mottek was the “Voice of the Chargers” at North Miami Beach Senior High School.
 1981–92 – Mottek was news anchor and reporter at WINZ, the CBS affiliate in Miami. During this time, he provided the live launch descriptions of more than 20 space shuttle launches on the CBS Radio Network. Mottek was on the air with CBS News Correspondent Christopher Glenn and was an eyewitness to the Space Shuttle Challenger disaster at the Kennedy Space Center in Florida on January 28, 1986
 1989–91 – Business news anchor/correspondent on "The Nightly Business Report" on PBS. Served as fill-in anchor for Paul Kangas on the Stock Market Report and Commentary segments
 1991–92 – Anchor and reporter at WTVJ-TV/Miami.
 1992–99 – News reporter on KCBS-TV, CBS 2 in Los Angeles.
 1999–2008 – Reported and anchored the business news on Los Angeles television station KTLA on the Morning News and News @ 10. 
 1999–2008 – Created and taught the Journalism 407 Newsradio course at the University of Southern California at the USC Annenberg School for Communication and Journalism.
 1992–2021 – News anchor/reporter at KNX (AM) Los Angeles KNX1070 Newsradio. He anchored the money news on the all-news radio station in Los Angeles. He also anchors the business news program Mottek On Money on air and on podcast. 
 2021- - Host, "Mottek on Money", KABC AM 790, Los Angeles
 2013–2014– Business news anchor at KCAL Channel 9 Los Angeles. His reports appeared on the KCAL9 TV News at 8 pm, 9pm and 10 pm.
 Mottek was on the air daily providing business updates during the 2008 financial crisis and he was on the air during the May 6, 2010 stock market "flash crash" on KNX/Los Angeles
 Mottek was on the air reporting before, during and after Hurricane Andrew hit South Florida in August 1992 on WINZ/Miami and WTVJ-TV/Miami. 
 Mottek was on the air with CBS News Correspondent Christopher Glenn and was an eyewitness to the Space Shuttle Challenger disaster at the Kennedy Space Center in Florida on January 28, 1986.

Event MC/Moderator 

 2006–present: Moderator of Economic Forecast events for the Los Angeles County Economic Development Corporation (LAEDC)
 1993–present: Master of Ceremonies of the Concern Foundation for Cancer Research Annual Block Party Fundraiser at Paramount Studios
 2011–present: Master of Ceremonies at the Association for Corporate Growth-L.A. Chapter Annual Awards Dinner at Disney Hall 
 2011–2017: Master of Ceremonies of the Los Angeles Venture Association (LAVA) annual awards dinner
 2010–2016: Moderator of Annual Economic Summit for the Southern California Association of Governments (SCAG)
 2003–2018: Master of Ceremonies of the Most Inspiring Student Awards Dinner for the Long Beach Education Foundation
 2014-Keynote interviewer of Eli Broad at the Downtown L.A. Investors Conference January 9 at the J.W. Marriott Hotel
 2013-Keynote speaker at Valley Economic Development Center (VEDC) Small Business Conference.
 2013-Moderator of City National Bank Insight One20 Conference, L.A. Convention Center
 2012, 2013– Moderator of real estate CEO discussions at the Crocker Symposium in Downtown L.A.
 2012-Moderator of "Still Made in the USA?" panel at the Milken Institute Global Conference, May 2, 2012
 2006– Keynote speaker at Southern California Investor Conference August 11 at the Hyatt Regency in Irvine, California.

Awards and honors 
 2021 Best Business and Consumer Reporting Golden Mike Award from the Radio and Television Association of Southern California for Mottek on Money on KNX 
 2013 Best "News Special" Golden Mike Award from the Radio and Television News Association of Southern California for "Healthcare Uncovered" on KNX
 2013 Outstanding News Professional PRism Award from the Public Relations Society of America-L.A. Chapter
 2013 "Spirit of Concern Award" from the Concern Foundation for Cancer Research
 2013 California State Assembly Certificate of Recognition from Assemblymember Richard Bloom for receiving "Spirit of Concern Award" 
 2011 Golden Mike Award from the Radio and Television News Association of Southern California for Best Business and Consumer Reporting.
 2011 President of the L.A. Chapter of the Society of Professional Journalists (SPJ-LA)
 2010 Vice-President of L.A. Chapter of the Society of Professional Journalists (SPJ-LA)
 2008 Mottek was part of the Emmy Award-winning KTLA Morning News team
 2007 Long Beach Unified School District Superintendent's Distinguished Community Service Award.
 2007 Certificate of Recognition from the California State Legislature in "honor and recognition of receiving the Long Beach Unified School District Superintendent's Distinguished Community Service Award
 2003 Award from the Long Beach Education Foundation for "Exemplary support of the children and schools of the Long Beach Unified School District"
 1998 Golden Mike Award from the Radio and Television News Association of Southern California for Best Live TV Coverage of a News Story for "Wrath of El Nino" on KCBS-TV
 1998 The Greater Los Angeles Press Club 1st Place Spot News Radio for coverage of North Valley Jewish Center shooting on KNX/Los Angeles
 1996 Golden Mike Award from the Radio and Television News Association of Southern California for Best Radio Spot News Story "Standoff in Silverlake" on KNX/Los Angeles
 1996 The Greater Los Angeles Press Club 1st Place Spot News Radio for "Standoff in Silverlake"
 Mottek was part of the Peabody Award-winning coverage of Hurricane Andrew on WTVJ-TV/Miami in 1992
 1992 RTNDA Award for Documentary "Cuba: Island in a Sea of Change" on WINZ/Miami
 1989 UPI National Investigative/Documentary Award for five-part series on kids selling crack cocaine, "Crack and Kids," on WINZ/Miami
 President of the Florida AP Broadcasters 1986–1989

Filmography

References

External links 
 

Year of birth missing (living people)
Living people
American radio journalists
American television journalists
Broward College alumni
Barry University alumni
American male journalists